In American folklore, the axehandle hound (axhandle hound, ax-handle hound, or similar) is a "fearsome critter" of Minnesota and Wisconsin. The animal resembles a dog with a body axe-like in shape. It has a head shaped like an axe blade, hence the name, complemented by a handle-shaped body atop short stubby legs. It subsists on a diet consisting entirely on the handles of axes which have been left unattended. A nocturnal creature, the axehandle hound travels from camp to camp searching for its next meal. In Minnesota, there is a canoe-access campground named Ax-Handle Hound after the folklore creature. It can be found on the Little Fork River near Voyageurs National Park and very near the town of Linden Grove.

See also
Fearsome critters
Folklore of the United States

References

Baughman, Ernest Warren - Type and Motif-index of the Folktales of England and North America, Mouton 1966, page 533.
Botkin, B. A. - The American People: Stories, Legends, Tales, Traditions and Songs, Transaction Publishers, page 250.
Botkin, B. A. - The Pocket Treasury of American Folklore, Pocket Books 1950
Rose, Carol - Giants, Monsters, and Dragons: An Encyclopedia of Folklore, Legend, and Myth, W. W. Norton & Company, page 32, 119.

External links
Description (in Italian)

Fearsome critters
Mythological dogs